A chalcogenone is a ketone or a variant containing a different chalcogen atom:
Thioketone
Selone
Telluroketone